The Cathédrale Notre-Dame of Our Lady of the Immaculate Conception is a Roman Catholic Cathedral under Metropolitan Archdiocese of Bangui in the Central African Republic (CAR). It is a large and elegant church built with red brick and is common type in French tropical colonies. 

It is centrally located in downtown Bangui, 2 km away from the Barthélemy Boganda Stadium and Bangui City Hall.

References

Churches in Bangui
Roman Catholic cathedrals in the Central African Republic
Roman Catholic Archdiocese of Bangui